Proportionalism, also known as mensuralism, is a hermeneutical approach to the performance of the earliest transcriptions of Gregorian chant prior to the adoption of mensural notation.  The approach can be contrasted with accentualism, or oratorical chant, an interpretation which applies a style of recitative singing.

See also
 Alternatim
 Cecilian Movement
 Schola Antiqua
 Semiology (Gregorian Chant)

References

Christian chants